Corby Spirit and Wine Limited is a Canadian alcohol manufacturing and distribution company. It was founded in 1859 in Corbyville, Ontario. As of 2008, the company is 46% owned by Pernod Ricard.  The company distills several Canadian specialities, as well as marketing Pernod Ricard's products in Canada. Corby is listed on the Toronto Stock Exchange under the trading symbols CSW.A and CSW.B.

History 
 1837, Henry Corby sells his bakery and starts buying grain before he opens his distillery in Corbyville, ON, near Belleville 
 1905, sold to Mortimer Davis as "H. Corby Distillery Company Limited"
 1918, sold to Canadian Industrial Alcohol Company Limited, merged with JP Wiser's Distillery Limited of Prescott, Ontario, J.M. Douglas and Company Limited, and Robert Macnish and Co. Limited of Scotland.
 1935 Gooderham and Worts acquires 51% share
 1952, the company wins right to produce United Rum Merchants of London's Lamb's Rum in Canada
 1954, the company buys stake in Tia Maria
 1969, the name is changed to "Corby Distilleries Limited – Les Distilleries Corby Limitée"
 1978, purchases Meagher's Distillery Limited of Montreal and its subsidiary, The William Mara Company of Toronto
 1985, Corby's parent company is purchased by Allied Lyons PLC
 1988, Corby divests itself of Robert MacNish Scotch Company, purchases McGuinness Distilling Co. Ltd from Heublein, and the spirits division of Nabisco
 1989, the distillery in Corbyville, Ontario closes
 1991, Corby buys Upper Canada Brewing Company, resold in 1995
 2005, Corby's parent company purchased by Pernod Ricard of France
 2006, Corby sells stake in Tia Maria to Pernod Ricard and purchases international rights to Lamb's Rum
 2011, sold 17 of its non-core brands and the Montreal bottling and production facility to Sazerac.
 2013, Corby changes its name to Corby Spirit and Wine Limited
 2016, Corby acquires the spirits assets of Domaines Pinnacle Inc., operating as a new Corby subsidiary, Ungava Spirits Co. Ltd.

Canadian brands 
Today, Corby owns or represents many of the 25 top-selling brands in Canada and is expanding its sales to the US, Europe and other international markets, such as Australia.

Corby's portfolio includes J.P. Wiser's Whisky, Lamb's rum, Polar Ice vodka and McGuinness liqueurs. Corby also represents leading international brands such as ABSOLUT vodka, Chivas Regal, The Glenlivet distillery and Ballantine's Scotch whiskies, Jameson Irish Whiskey, Beefeater Gin, Malibu rum, Kahlúa liqueur, Mumm Champagne, and Jacob's Creek, Stoneleigh, Graffigna, Campo Viejo, and Wyndham Estate wines.
 Wiser's whisky
 Polar Ice Vodka
 Lamb's Rum
 McGuinness Liqueur Family
 Pike Creek Canadian Whisky
 Lot 40 Canadian Whisky
 Hiram Walker's Special Old
 Royal Reserve
 Cabot Trail
 Ungava Premium Gin
 The Foreign Affair Winery 
 Chic Choc

References

External links 
  (age-restricted access)

Canadian whisky
Companies listed on the Toronto Stock Exchange
Distilleries in Canada
Food and drink companies based in Toronto
Manufacturing companies based in Toronto
Pernod Ricard brands
Cuisine of Ontario
1859 establishments in Ontario
Food and drink companies established in 1859
Canadian companies established in 1859